Stašov is a municipality and village in Beroun District in the Central Bohemian Region of the Czech Republic. It has about 500 inhabitants.

Transport
The municipality is located on a regional railway line leading from Beroun to Plzeň.

Gallery

References

Villages in the Beroun District